Robert Morris (born 4 October 1948) is an Australian former racing driver. Morris was one of the leading touring car drivers during the 1970s and continued racing until 1984. Morris won Australia's premier Touring car race, the Bathurst 1000 in 1976. He also won the Australian Touring Car Championship in 1979. Morris was inducted into the V8 Supercars Hall of Fame in 2004.

Early years 

Morris got his early start in racing through his father Ray Morris who was racing at the time in early sports sedan racing with a modified Ford Falcon. Bob Morris made his Bathurst 1000 debut in 1968 driving a Toyota Corolla with Bruce Hindhaugh in the team backed by Australian Toyota importers AMI that his father Ray also drove for. Morris and Hindhaugh won their class. Morris again registered a class win the following year with Brian Sampson, again in an AMI Corolla.

In 1970, spotted by team boss Harry Firth, Morris was picked up by the Holden Dealer Team. He was paired with the HDT's other young charger, Peter Brock in a Torana GTR XU-1 but a troubled race saw them finish well back in the field. 1971 saw Morris paired with father Ray, taking out fastest lap at Bathurst in a Ford Falcon GTHO but the family team retired early, the big Ford overheating.

In 1973 Morris received backing from Sydney car dealer Ron Hodgson Motors and the Seven TV Network for his Torana GTR XU-1 campaign. In the 1973 and 1974 seasons Morris was very competitive in the Sun-7 Chesterfield Series at Amaroo Park driving against the Holden Dealer Team's Colin Bond and other top Sydney drivers. Then in 1975 he won his first Touring Car Championship round at Amaroo.

1976 Bathurst victory 
In 1975 Morris finished second at Bathurst in the Ron Hodgson Torana SL/R5000 L34 with co-driver Frank Gardner. The following year Bob Morris, with British touring car ace John Fitzpatrick as co-driver, went one better – winning in a dramatic finish at Bathurst. In the final laps of the 1976 race John Fitzpatrick nursed home the ailing Morris Torana which was trailing smoke. Rival Torana driver Colin Bond was within striking distance of the lead if Fitzpatrick had to pit and there were emotional scenes as chief Ron Hodgson team mechanic, Bruce Richardson, slumped disconsolately in the pits seemingly resigned to seeing victory snatched from the team's grasp. Meanwhile, a nervous Bob Morris paced up and down the pits with fingers crossed but the slowing Ron Hodgson Torana managed to make it to the finish line first with Bond in 2nd place on the same lap.

Many believed that Fitzpatrick had nursed home the Torana after it had suffered a broken axle, and indeed this was reported as the reason for the car almost failing to finish. Fitzpatrick later set the record straight when he revealed that a leaking oil seal (which was the cause of the smoke) was making the clutch slip badly. This made it much harder to accelerate the car to the top of the mountain, especially out of The Cutting which is one of the slowest and steepest corners on the circuit.

In 1987, motoring writer Bill Tuckey in his book The Rise and Fall of Peter Brock claimed that there had been a lap scoring error in the 1976 race and that Colin Bond's Torana was the first car to complete the distance. Tuckey claimed Holden declined to challenge the result because a privately entered Holden team had won in such a memorable, emotional finish. He also claimed it was because Bob Morris' major sponsor was Ron Hodgson Motors, one of Sydney's leading Holden dealerships at the time, and Holden didn't want to sour relations with Hodgson. It remains however a contested footnote, Bob Morris denies that this was the case, claiming every other team lap scorers other than the HDT agreed that the results posted by the Australian Racing Drivers Club (ARDC) were correct. Despite this, Bond's co-driver John Harvey believes that he and Bond did indeed win the race, despite the official result still showing Morris and Fitzpatrick as race winners.

Touring Car Champion 

In 1979 Bob Morris, in an A9X Torana, won a hard-fought Australian Touring Car Championship title ahead of Holden Dealer Team driver Peter Brock. Morris also won the AMSCAR Series, run at Amaroo Park (in a one-off appearance, Morris had a new team mate for the opening round of the AMSCAR series, long time Ford driver Allan Moffat). At the Bathurst 1000 that year Morris was 2nd fastest qualifier but Brock, in his new A9X Torana, ran away from the field at the start of the race, leading every lap of the event showing the superiority of the HDT by setting the races fastest lap (also the lap record at the time) on the very last lap of the race. Hodgson, having seen his team beat the HDT to the Touring Car title, withdrew from racing, having achieved all he had set out to do. Morris was re-united with Frank Gardner, who was team manager of Allan Grice's Craven Mild Racing team. Morris helped develop a new Holden VC Commodore during the Touring Car Championship, but by the enduros he had left the team and raced Bill O'Brien's Ford XD Falcon during the 1980 endurance season, including the 1980 Hardie-Ferodo 1000 where the Falcon carried one of Channel 7's Racecam units.

Collision at 1981 Bathurst 
Bob Morris was involved in a dramatic collision at the notorious McPhillamy Park corner during the 1981 Bathurst 1000. Morris' Falcon, when running in 2nd place, came together with the Falcon of Christine Gibson leading to a six car pile-up that blocked the track. The other cars involved were the Commodores of Garry Rogers and Tony Edmondson, the Gemini of David Seldon and the pole winning Chevrolet Camaro Z28 of Kevin Bartlett, with others such as John Goss in his Jaguar XJS narrowly avoiding the accident by stopping in time. As the track was blocked and the race had gone past 75% of the full distance, the officials declared the race over 43 laps short of the full distance (race regulations did not allow for a restart) and so the Bob Morris/John Fitzpatrick car was awarded 2nd place behind the similar Falcon of Dick Johnson and John French. The crash though would have repercussions for Morris' racing career. Morris would have balance issues that affected his ability to race, but the talent was always there.

1982 would see a two car 'super team' with  Formula One World Champion Alan Jones, but with the two drivers steering different cars, Morris a V8 powered Ford XE Falcon, Jones a rotary powered Mazda RX-7. The partnership dissolved at the end of the 1982 season, in particular after a disappointing Bathurst which saw the very competitive Falcon badly damaged in a crash on Saturday afternoon by his co-driver John Fitzpatrick when a wheel broke and sent the car into a concrete wall, the car irreparable for the Sunday morning start, though Morris would line up in his grid position during the pre-race sitting in a chair with 4 wheels surrounding him.

Morris made a comeback to motor racing at the 1983 James Hardie 1000. Originally he had planned to enter a Holden VH Commodore SS, but negotiations to buy the spare Holden Dealer Team car fell through only weeks before the race. He went to Bathurst anyway, only as a spectator (though with his driving suit and helmet, just in case), but was offered the drive in the Commodore to be driven by its owner Rusty French, and former Re-Car team owner Allan Browne. Never a serious racer and admittedly uncomfortable in the car, Browne spotted Morris in the pits and after talking to him offered to step aside to allow the 1976 winner to race. Despite not having previously driven the car, Morris was immediately 6.3 seconds faster than French and managed to move the car from 31st to 10th in qualifying, enough to qualify for Hardies Heroes. He would eventually start 9th following the Hardies Heroes crash of Dick Johnson who destroyed his Greens-Tuf XE Falcon at Forrest's Elbow. Incredibly, thanks to some car swapping, Johnson started the race from 10th position in a replacement Falcon which was re-built overnight. Ironically this Falcon was the same car that John Fitzpatrick had crashed in practice which saw it a non-starter in 1982. In the race, Morris diced early with the RX-7 of Allan Moffat, but brake problems due to the brake fluid boiling saw Morris and French finish in 8th place, nine laps down on the winning HDT Commodore of John Harvey, Peter Brock and Larry Perkins.

Morris returned to full-time touring car racing part way through the 1984 season in a Barry Jones prepared RX-7. After first winning Round 3 of the Amaroo Park based AMSCAR Series, he went on to qualify 2nd a week later at Oran Park for Round 5 of the 1984 ATCC. With his RX-7 fitted with a road standard gearbox, Morris pulled off a surprise win in his first ATCC start since 1982. It was to be Morris' 9th and last ATCC round win.

Morris had his final start at Bathurst in the 1984 James Hardie 1000 in what was the final Group C Bathurst 1000. Morris qualified the RX-7 in 9th place after "Hardies Heroes". Partnered with car owner Barry Jones, the pair failed to finish after suffering repeated gearbox problems throughout the race, including replacing the gearbox in the early laps. The Morris/Jones Mazda only completed 97 of the races 163 laps. That year Morris retired from competitive driving, at the comparatively young age of 36, to live on his property at Kangaroo Valley.

Bob Morris stayed semi-involved with the sport and at the 1987 James Hardie 1000 at Bathurst was the driver of the races first ever Pace car. The pace cars had been introduced to Bathurst that year to conform to the FIA's World Touring Car Championship rules, of which Bathurst was a round in 1987.

Career results

Complete Australian Touring Car Championship results
(key) (Races in bold indicate pole position) (Races in italics indicate fastest lap)

Complete Bathurst 1000 results

References 

Australia's Greatest Motor Race 1960–1999 (Chevron) © 2000
Racing Car News October 1976
https://web.archive.org/web/20081024020246/http://www.bowdensown.com.au/cars/hodgsonxu1.html

1948 births
Australian Touring Car Championship drivers
Bathurst 1000 winners
Living people
Racing drivers from Sydney
Sportsmen from New South Wales
Australian Endurance Championship drivers